The Soubrette and the Simp is a 1914 American silent comedy film featuring Mabel Paige and Oliver Hardy.

Plot

Cast
 Oliver Hardy as Fred, the Simp (as Babe Hardy)
 Mabel Paige as The Soubrette
 Don Ferrando as Owner of the show

See also
 Oliver Hardy filmography

External links

1914 films
American silent short films
1914 short films
American black-and-white films
1914 comedy films
Films directed by Jerold T. Hevener
Silent American comedy films
American comedy short films
1910s American films